Gildart is both a surname and a given name. Notable people with the name include:

Ian Gildart (born 1969), English rugby league player
Oliver Gildart (born 1996), English rugby league player
Richard Gildart (1673–1770), English merchant
Gildart Jackson, British actor